Cadet College Club Limited or CCCL is a pan-national club for the alumni of all cadet colleges in Bangladesh and is located in Purbachal New Town, Narayanganj. Shahadat Musharraf Khan (Mukul) is the present president (second term) and T. M. Shahidul Islam is the present Secretary General of the club. The club was formed in 2003 with the alumni from 10 cadet colleges of Bangladesh(former East Pakistan) and Bangali alumni of military schools situated in the then West Pakistan. The Clubs holds its own annual book fair, picnic, and musical festivals.

References

2003 establishments in Bangladesh
Clubs and societies in Bangladesh
Organisations based in Dhaka